Natalia Martyasheva or Natalya Martyasheva (6 January 1988 - 8 June 2011) was a Russian para table tennis player who was born with cerebral palsy. She is a Paralympic champion in table tennis in 2008 and a triple European silver medalist.

References

1988 births
2011 deaths
Sportspeople from Saratov
Russian female table tennis players
Table tennis players at the 2008 Summer Paralympics
Medalists at the 2008 Summer Paralympics
Paralympic medalists in table tennis
Paralympic gold medalists for Russia
Paralympic table tennis players of Russia
20th-century Russian women
21st-century Russian women